Danko Opančina (Serbian Cyrillic: Данко Опанчина; born 27 July 1990) is a Serbian football defender.

External links
 Profile at Srbijafudbal
 

1990 births
Living people
Sportspeople from Kraljevo
Serbian footballers
Association football defenders
FK Sloga Kraljevo players
FK Radnički 1923 players
FK Smederevo players
Serbian SuperLiga players